Wéi is a Chinese surname. It means ‘leather’ in Classical Chinese. It was the 62nd most common name in China as of 2018. It is Wai in Cantonese. It is the 50th name on the Hundred Family Surnames poem.

The Wei (韋) family name is derived from the surnames Peng (彭) and Xiong (熊) from the ancient state of Chu. During the Han Dynasty, Han Xin's son escaped to Wei Country (韋) because of the purge of Empress Lü Zhi, and later took the surname Wei (韋) from the region's name. A 2013 study by the Fuxi Cultural Association found it to be the 66th most common name, shared by 4.3 million people or 0.320% of the population, with the province with the most being Guangxi.

Possible origins
 from Shi Wei (豕韋), the name of a state in modern Henan province, originally granted to Yuan Zhe by the Emperor Shao Kang in the Xia dynasty
 from Wei (韋) as a title of an official in charge of the manufacture of leather goods
 from the Wei (韋) family in the ancient state of Shu Le in present-day Xinjiang during the Western Han dynasty
 allegedly borne by descendants of Han Xin, an official in the early Western Han dynasty who was killed on the orders of Empress Lü. His descendants fled to the area of present-day Guangdong and Guangxi, and in order to avoid persecution they simplified their surname Han (韓) to Wei (韋) by removing the left radical,
 descendants of Huan Yanfan (桓彥範), who was given the surname by the emperor Emperor Zhongzong of Tang as a token of appreciation

Notables
 Wei Kang (韋康; died 213), courtesy name Yuanjiang, was an official who lived in the late Eastern Han dynasty of China.
 Empress Wei (韋皇后), wife of Emperor Zhongzong at Tang Dynasty period
 Wei Yongli (韦永丽), Chinese sprinter
 Wei Yi (韦奕), chess player
 Wei Wei (韦唯), Chinese singer
 Wei Lijie (韦利杰), Chinese Antarctic researcher
 Wei Dongyi (韦东奕), Chinese mathematician
 William Wei Li-an (韋禮安), Taiwanese Mandopop and folk-rock singer-songwriter
 Wei Guoqing (韦国清), ethnic Zhuang PLA General and politician

References

Individual Chinese surnames